Älmhults IF is a Swedish football club located in Älmhult in Kronoberg County.

Background
Älmhults Idrottsförening was founded on 22 April 1919. The sports club has provided for bandy, ice-hockey, skiing and track and field as well as football. The club has used Älmevallen playing field since 1929. The youth teams use Haganässkolan.

Since their foundation, Älmhults IF have participated mainly in the middle divisions of the Swedish football league system.  The club currently plays in Division 3 Sydvästra Götaland, which is the fifth tier of Swedish football. They play their home matches at the Älmevallen in Älmhult.

Älmhults IF are affiliated with Smålands Fotbollförbund.

Recent history
In recent seasons Älmhults IF have competed in the following divisions:

2016 — Division III, Sydöstra Götaland
2015 – Division III, Sydöstra Götaland
2014 – Division III, Sydöstra Götaland
2013 – Division III, Sydvästra Götaland
2012 – Division III, Sydöstra Götaland
2011 – Division III, Sydvästra Götaland
2010 – Division III, Sydöstra Götaland
2009 – Division III, Sydöstra Götaland
2008 – Division III, Sydöstra Götaland
2007 – Division III, Sydöstra Götaland
2006 – Division IV, Småland Södra Elit
2005 – Division IV, Småland Västra Elit
2004 – Division IV, Småland Östra Elit
2003 – Division III, Sydvästra Götaland
2002 – Division IV, Småland Västra Elit
2001 – Division IV, Småland Västra Elit
2000 – Division III, Sydvästra Götaland
1999 – Division III, Sydöstra Götaland
1998 – Division III, Sydöstra Götaland
1997 – Division II, Östra Götaland
1996 – Division II, Östra Götaland
1995 – Division II, Östra Götaland
1994 – Division III, Sydöstra Götaland
1993 – Division III, Sydöstra Götaland

Attendances

In recent seasons Älmhults IF have had the following average attendances:

Footnotes

External links
 Älmhults IF – Official website
 Älmhults IF/FK on Facebook

Football clubs in Kronoberg County
Association football clubs established in 1919
1919 establishments in Sweden